One of Many may refer to:

One of Many (film), 1917
One of Many (Kenny Wheeler album) 2011
One of Many (Eric Lau album) 2013